Neptis yerburii, or Yerbury's sailer, is a nymphalid butterfly found in India, (Assam and Sikkim), parts of China, Burma and Thailand.

Gallery

References

yerburii
Butterflies of Asia
Butterflies of Indochina
Butterflies described in 1886